Walter Glechner (12 February 1939 – 29 January 2015) was an Austrian footballer.

Club career
Glechner spent the majority of his career at Austria giants Rapid Wien, playing over 250 league matches in a 13-year spell.

International career
Glechner made his debut for Austria in a May 1960 friendly match against Scotland and earned a total of 35 caps, scoring 1 goals. He represented his country in 2 FIFA World Cup qualification matches.

His final international was a June 1968 match against the Soviet Union.

International goals
Scores and results list Austria's goal tally first.

References

External links
 
 Sturm Archiv

1939 births
2015 deaths
Austrian footballers
Austria international footballers
Association football defenders
SK Rapid Wien players